The Peyser Building—Security Savings and Commercial Bank is an historic structure located in the Golden Triangle section of Downtown Washington, D.C.  It was listed on both the District of Columbia Inventory of Historic Sites and on the National Register of Historic Places in 2012.  The building was designed by architect George N. Ray and built between 1927–1928.

References

Office buildings completed in 1928
Office buildings on the National Register of Historic Places in Washington, D.C.
1928 establishments in Washington, D.C.